Cyclops is a 1982 Croatian film directed by Antun Vrdoljak, based on the 1965 novel of the same title by Ranko Marinković.

Cast
Frano Lasić as Melkior Tresić
Ljuba Tadić as Maestro
Rade Šerbedžija as Ugo
Mira Furlan as Enka
María Baxa as Vivijana
Mustafa Nadarević as Don Fernando
Relja Bašić as ATMA
Boris Dvornik - Starojugoslavenski oficir
Ivo Gregurević - Krele
Dragan Milivojević - Fredi
Karlo Bulić

References

External links

Cyclops at hrfilm.hr 

1982 films
Croatian war drama films
1980s Croatian-language films
Yugoslav war drama films
Films based on Croatian novels
Films directed by Antun Vrdoljak